Euphoria is an American teen drama television series created and principally written by Sam Levinson for HBO and based on the Israeli miniseries of the same name created by Ron Leshem and Daphna Levin. The series' main character is Rue Bennett (Zendaya), a recovering teenage drug addict who struggles to find her place in the world.

The series has been widely acclaimed by critics for its  acting, story, visuals, and approach to mature subject matter. Euphoria has been nominated for many awards, including 25 Primetime Emmy Awards (9 wins), one Golden Globe Award (won), 3 Critics' Choice Television Awards (one win), one Peabody Award, one Screen Actors Guild Award, and one Writers Guild of America Award.

Euphoria was nominated for Primetime Emmy Award for Outstanding Drama Series in 2022. Zendaya won both the Primetime Emmy Award for Outstanding Lead Actress in a Drama Series (twice), the Golden Globe Award for Best Actress – Television Series Drama, and the Critics' Choice Television Award for Best Actress in a Drama Series, while Sweeney was nominated for Primetime Emmy Award for Outstanding Supporting Actress in a Drama Series.

Awards and nominations

References

External links
 

+Awards list
Euphoria